Oceanside Transit Center is a major railway interchange in Oceanside, California, serving both intercity and suburban/commuter services. The station is used by Amtrak on the route of its Pacific Surfliner service between San Diego and San Luis Obispo. It is also a terminus for two different regional transit operators – Metrolink, the commuter rail operator for the Los Angeles area, has two of its services, the Orange County Line and Inland Empire–Orange County Line, that terminate at Oceanside (it is the only Metrolink station in San Diego County), while the North County Transit District, the operator for most of the public transport in North San Diego County, has its COASTER and SPRINTER services also terminating at Oceanside. Oceanside Transit Center is also served by Greyhound Lines, numerous BREEZE buses, and is also the terminal for Riverside Transit Agency's Bus Route 202 to Temecula and Murrieta (which is temporarily suspended in response to the COVID-19 pandemic). COASTER and Metrolink trains going out of service will head to Stuart Mesa but due to the small facility, some Metrolinks set will either be kept at the nearby Fallbrook Yard or stored on an empty track south of the station.

History 
Oceanside Transit Center was built in 1984, and serves as a replacement for a 1946-built Santa Fe Depot, which was torn down in 1988. The former station was itself a replacement for an 1886-built Santa Fe Depot. This station became one of the original 9 stations on Metrolink's Orange County Line when that line opened on March 28, 1994, and North County Transit District's COASTER commuter rail began serving this station when the line opened on February 27, 1995 and Metrolink's Inland Empire–Orange County Line began serving this station regularly in the early 2000s after serving the station on a temporary basis from that line's opening on October 2, 1995, until the early 2000s and North County Transit District's SPRINTER light rail began serving this station when the line opened on March 9, 2008.

Expansion 
To enhance the regional transit service, this station had major expansion including building a third track and platform in the middle of the existing tracks, extending all platforms, and adding a passenger walkway. Construction on the project began in 2016, the third platform opened in May 2017, and Platform 1 reopened November 20.

Platforms and tracks

References

External links 

COASTER Stations
SPRINTER Stations
Oceanside station – USA RailGuide (TrainWeb)
Oceanside station – Greyhound

Amtrak stations in San Diego County, California
Bus stations in San Diego County, California
Metrolink (California) stations
North County Transit District stations
Oceanside, California
Transit centers in the United States
Transportation in San Diego County, California
Railway stations in the United States opened in 1886
1886 establishments in California
Railway stations in the United States opened in 1946
1946 establishments in California
Railway stations in the United States opened in 1984
1984 establishments in California
Former Atchison, Topeka and Santa Fe Railway stations in California